The West Genesee Central School District (WGCSD) is a public school district located in suburban Syracuse, NY. Student enrollment as of the 2012-2013 academic year is 4,740. The district has 815 employees, 438 of which are academic professionals. 98% of students graduating in 2014 earned a  Regents Diploma.

Administration
The district offices are located adjacent to Stonehedge Elementary at 300 Sanderson Drive in Camillus. The Superintendent of schools is David C. Bills. Mike Burns is the Athletic Director and William Davern is the Director of Fine Arts.

Board of Education

The Board of Education has nine members elected to three year terms who serve without pay.

Current members:
Kimberly B. Coyne, President
Vladimiro Hart-Zavoli, Vice President
Elizabeth Donaldson
Matthew Hudson
Jennifer James
Jeffrey Reina
Aaron Ryder
Gregory Stone
Barbara A. Wells

List of Schools
High School (Grades 9-12):
West Genesee High School
Junior High School (Grades 7-8)
Camillus Middle School
Middle School (Grades 5-6):
West Genesee Middle School
Elementary Schools (Grades K-4):
East Hill Elementary School
Onondaga Road Elementary School
Split Rock Elementary School
Stonehedge Elementary School

Bird's Eye Images
East Hill Elementary
Onondaga Road Elementary
Split Rock Elementary
Stonehedge Elementary
Camillus Middle
West Genesee Middle
West Genesee High

References

External links
West Genesee Central School District Homepage

School districts in New York (state)
Education in Onondaga County, New York
School districts established in 1952